California Township is one of nine townships in Starke County, in the U.S. state of Indiana. As of the 2010 census, its population was 2,011 and it contained 1,383 housing units.

Geography

Cities, towns, villages
 Bass Lake (southwest half)

Unincorporated towns
 Aldine at 
 Bass Station at 
(This list is based on USGS data and may include former settlements.)

Adjacent townships
 Center Township (north)
 Washington Township (northeast)
 North Bend Township (east)
 Tippecanoe Township, Pulaski County (southeast)
 Franklin Township, Pulaski County (south)
 Rich Grove Township, Pulaski County (southwest)
 Wayne Township (west)
 Jackson Township (northwest)

Major highways

Airports and landing strips
 Wheeler Airport

Lakes
 Round Lake

School districts
 Knox Community School Corporation
 North Judson-San Pierre School Corporation

Political districts
 Indiana's 2nd congressional district
 State House District 17
 State Senate District 5

References
 United States Census Bureau 2008 TIGER/Line Shapefiles
 United States Board on Geographic Names (GNIS)
 IndianaMap

External links
 Indiana Township Association
 United Township Association of Indiana

Townships in Starke County, Indiana
Townships in Indiana